Vankya ornithogali is a plant pathogen, also called yellow star-of-Bethlehem smut. It may infect the plant Gagea spathacea.

References

External links 
 USDA ARS Fungal Database

Fungal plant pathogens and diseases
Ustilaginomycotina